The 2012–13 Philadelphia 76ers season was the 74th season of the franchise, 64th in the National Basketball Association (NBA), and the 50th in Philadelphia. Before the start of the season the team made a major multiple team trade to get center Andrew Bynum from the Los Angeles Lakers (giving up the eventual 2015 NBA Finals MVP Andre Iguodala). However Bynum missed the entire regular season due to a foot injury sustained while bowling, and would never end up playing in a Sixers uniform. They finished with a record of 34–48 and would miss the post season in Doug Collins' 3rd and final season as head coach.

Key dates
 June 28: The 2012 NBA draft took place at the Prudential Center in Newark, New Jersey.

NBA Draft

× Philadelphia acquired the draft rights to 27th pick Arnett Moultrie from the Miami Heat in exchange for the draft rights to 45th pick Justin Hamilton and a future first-round draft pick.
° Traded draft rights to Brooklyn in exchange for cash considerations.

Pre-season

|- style="background:#cfc;"
| 1
| October 11
| @ Orlando
| 
| Jrue Holiday (27)
| Lavoy Allen (8)
| Maalik Wayns (6)
| Amway Center18,106
| 1–0
|- style="background:#fcc;"
| 2
| October 13
| Brooklyn
| 
| Nick Young (21)
| Lavoy Allen (8)
| Jrue Holiday (9)
| Boardwalk Hall6,887
| 1–1
|- style="background:#cfc;"
| 3
| October 15
| Boston
| 
| Spencer Hawes (17)
| Spencer Hawes (8)
| Maalik Wayns (8)
| Wells Fargo Center8,483
| 2–1
|- style="background:#cfc;"
| 4
| October 17
| Cleveland
| 
| Nick Young, Maalik Wayns (19)
| Lavoy Allen (11)
| Spencer Hawes (7)
| Wells Fargo Center8,170
| 3–1
|- style="background:#cfc;"
| 5
| October 19
| @ Brooklyn
| 
| Thaddeus Young (24)
| Dorell Wright (11)
| Jrue Holiday (12)
| Barclays Center13,270
| 4–1
|- style="background:#cfc;"
| 6
| October 21
| @ Boston
| 
| Dorell Wright (20)
| Jrue Holiday, Nick Young (6)
| Jrue Holiday (5)
| TD Garden18,624
| 5–1
|- style="background:#cfc;"
| 7
| October 22
| New York
| 
| Jason Richardson (23)
| Lavoy Allen (13)
| Jason Richardson (6)
| Carrier Dome8,831
| 6–1

Roster

Regular season

Standings

Game log

|- style="background:#cfc;"
| 1 || October 31 || Denver
| 
| Spencer Hawes (16)
| Spencer Hawes (12)
| Jrue Holiday (11)
| Wells Fargo Center19,101
| 1–0

|- style="background:#fcc;"
| 2 || November 4 || @ New York
| 
| Jrue Holiday (27)
| Evan Turner (11)
| Jrue Holiday (7)
| Madison Square Garden19,033
| 1-1
|- style="background:#fcc;"
| 3 || November 5 || New York
| 
| Jrue Holiday (17)
| Thaddeus Young (10)
| Jrue Holiday (8)
| Wells Fargo Center15,783
| 1-2
|- style="background:#cfc;"
| 4 || November 7 || @ New Orleans
| 
| Turner & Holiday (14)
| Thaddeus Young (10)
| Jrue Holiday (12)
| New Orleans Arena12,988
| 2-2
|- style="background:#cfc;"
| 5 || November 9 || @ Boston
| 
| Evan Turner (25)
| Evan Turner (11)
| Jrue Holiday (14)
| TD Garden18,624
| 3-2
|- style="background:#cfc;"
| 6 || November 10 || @ Toronto
| 
| Holiday, N. Young& T. Young (16)
| Evan Turner (12)
| Holiday & Ivey (5)
| Air Canada Centre19,800
| 4-2
|- style="background:#fcc;"
| 7 || November 12 || Milwaukee
| 
| Jrue Holiday (25)
| Thaddeus Young (7)
| Jrue Holiday (6)
| Wells Fargo Center15,086
| 4-3
|- style="background:#fcc;"
| 8 || November 14 || Detroit
| 
| Lavoy Allen (14)
| Thaddeus Young (8)
| Jrue Holiday (7)
| Wells Fargo Center11,879
| 4-4
|- style="background:#cfc;"
| 9 || November 16 || Utah
| 
| Jrue Holiday (26)
| Allen, Richardson& T. Young (8)
| Jrue Holiday (7)
| Wells Fargo Center15,851
| 5-4
|- style="background:#cfc;"
| 10 || November 18 || Cleveland
| 
| Evan Turner (19)
| Hawes & Richardson (9)
| Holiday & Turner (9)
| Wells Fargo Center15,021
| 6-4
|- style="background:#cfc;"
| 11 || November 20 || Toronto
| 
| Nick Young (23)
| Jrue Holiday (8)
| Jrue Holiday (12)
| Wells Fargo Center13,965
| 7-4
|- style="background:#fcc;"
| 12 || November 21 || @ Cleveland
| 
| Holiday & Richardson (16)
| Thaddeus Young (11)
| Evan Turner (7)
| Quicken Loans Arena16,743
| 7-5
|- style="background:#fcc;"
| 13 || November 24 || Oklahoma City
| 
| Thaddeus Young (29)
| Thaddeus Young (15)
| Jrue Holiday (13)
| Wells Fargo Center19,611
| 7-6
|- style="background:#cfc;"
| 14 || November 25 || Phoenix
| 
| Jrue Holiday (33)
| Evan Turner (9)
| Jrue Holiday (13)
| Wells Fargo Center14,518
| 8-6
|- style="background:#cfc;"
| 15 || November 27 || Dallas
| 
| Evan Turner (22)
| Brown & Richardson (8)
| Jrue Holiday (7)
| Wells Fargo Center15,107
| 9-6
|- style="background:#cfc;"
| 16 || November 30 || @ Charlotte
| 
| Evan Turner (25)
| Allen & Turner (10)
| Jrue Holiday (15)
| Time Warner Cable Arena13202
| 10-6

|- style="background:#fcc;"
| 17 || December 1 || @ Chicago
| 
| Jrue Holiday (23)
| Lavoy Allen (8)
| Holiday & Turner (7)
| United Center21,607
| 10-7
|- style="background:#fcc;"
| 18 || December 4 || Minnesota
| 
| Evan Turner (19)
| Jason Richardson (7)
| Jrue Holiday (9)
| Wells Fargo Center13,986
| 10-8
|- style="background:#cfc;"
| 19 || December 7 || Boston
|  (OT)
| Evan Turner (26)
| Thaddeus Young (12)
| Evan Turner (5)
| Wells Fargo Center17,921
| 11-8
|- style="background:#fcc;"
| 20 || December 8 || @ Boston
| 
| Thaddeus Young (22)
| Lavoy Allen (9)
| Jrue Holiday (8)
| TD Garden18,624
| 11-9
|- style="background:#cfc;"
| 21 || December 10 || Detroit
| 
| Jrue Holiday (25)
| Evan Turner (11)
| Jrue Holiday (8)
| Wells Fargo Center15,225
| 12-9
|- style="background:#fcc;"
| 22 || December 12 || Chicago
| 
| Jrue Holiday (26)
| Spencer Hawes (10)
| Jrue Holiday (9)
| Wells Fargo Center15,738
| 12-10
|- style="background:#fcc;"
| 23 || December 14 || @ Indiana
| 
| Evan Turner (22)
| Evan Turner (10)
| Turner & N. Young (5)
| Bankers Life Fieldhouse13,538
| 12-11
|- style="background:#fcc;"
| 24 || December 16 || L. A. Lakers
| 
| Nick Young (30)
| Kwame Brown (8)
| Dorell Wright (9)
| Wells Fargo Center20,338
| 12-12
|- style="background:#fcc;"
| 25 || December 18 || @ Dallas
| 
| Dorell Wright (25)
| Brown, Hawes& T. Young (7)
| Maalik Wayns (9)
| American Airlines Center20,162
| 12-13
|- style="background:#fcc;"
| 26 || December 19 || @ Houston
| 
| Nick Young (21)
| Lavoy Allen (7)
| Dorell Wright (6)
| Toyota Center15,266
| 12-14
|- style="background:#cfc;"
| 27 || December 21 || Atlanta
| 
| Evan Turner (21)
| Thaddeus Young (11)
| Holiday & Richardson (7)
| Wells Fargo Center18,061
| 13-14
|- style="background:#fcc;"
| 28 || December 23 || @ Brooklyn
| 
| Jrue Holiday (24)
| Thaddeus Young (10)
| Jrue Holiday (9)
| Barclays Center17,732
| 13-15
|- style="background:#cfc;"
| 29 || December 26 || @ Memphis
| 
| Dorell Wright (28)
| Spencer Hawes (9)
| Holiday & Turner (9)
| FedExForum16,055
| 14-15
|- style="background:#fcc;"
| 30 || December 28 || @ Golden State
| 
| Jrue Holiday (21)
| Thaddeus Young (10)
| Jrue Holiday (10)
| Oracle Arena19,596
| 14-16
|- style="background:#fcc;"
| 31 || December 29 || @ Portland
| 
| Jrue Holiday (29)
| Spencer Hawes (11)
| Jrue Holiday (9)
| Rose Garden20,569
| 14-17

|- style="background:#cfc;"
| 32 || January 1 || @ L. A. Lakers
| 
| Jrue Holiday (26)
| Evan Turner (13)
| Jrue Holiday (10)
| Staples Center18,997
| 15-17
|- style="background:#fcc;"
| 33 || January 2 || @ Phoenix
| 
| Jrue Holiday (16)
| Holiday & T. Young (10)
| Jrue Holiday (10)
| US Airways Center16,034
| 15-18
|- style="background:#fcc;"
| 34 || January 4 || @ Oklahoma City
| 
| Nick Young (21)
| Spencer Hawes (13)
| Jrue Holiday (9)
| Chesapeake Energy Arena18,203
| 15-19
|- style="background:#fcc;"
| 35 || January 5 || @ San Antonio
| 
| Spencer Hawes (22)
| Jrue Holiday (8)
| Jrue Holiday (8)
| AT&T Center18,581
| 15-20
|- style="background:#fcc;"
| 36 || January 8 || Brooklyn
| 
| Jrue Holiday (19)
| Evan Turner (7)
| Jrue Holiday (8)
| Wells Fargo Center16,167
| 15-21
|- style="background:#fcc;"
| 37 || January 9 || @ Toronto
| 
| Holiday & T. Young (16)
| Spencer Hawes (9)
| Evan Turner (5)
| Air Canada Centre15,629
| 15-22
|- style="background:#cfc;"
| 38 || January 12 || Houston
| 
| Jrue Holiday (30)
| Thaddeus Young (12)
| Jrue Holiday (9)
| Wells Fargo Center17,329
| 16-22
|- style="background:#fcc;"
| 39 || January 15 || New Orleans
| 
| Jrue Holiday (29)
| Evan Turner (7)
| Jrue Holiday (11)
| Wells Fargo Center17,304
| 16-23
|- style="background:#cfc;"
| 40 || January 18 || Toronto
| 
| Jrue Holiday (33)
| Thaddeus Young (14)
| Jrue Holiday (14)
| Wells Fargo Center16,574
| 17-23
|- style="background:#fcc;"
| 41 || January 21 || San Antonio
| 
| Evan Turner (18)
| Evan Turner (12)
| Jrue Holiday (8)
| Wells Fargo Center15,346
| 17-24
|- style="background:#fcc;"
| 42 || January 22 || @ Milwaukee
| 
| Evan Turner (23)
| Spencer Hawes (12)
| Jrue Holiday (12)
| Bradley Center13,080
| 17-25
|- style="background:#cfc;"
| 43 || January 26 || New York
| 
| Jrue Holiday (35)
| Evan Turner (6)
| Jrue Holiday (6)
| Wells Fargo Center20,540
| 18-25
|- style="background:#fcc;"
| 44 || January 28 || Memphis
| 
| Evan Turner (27)
| Thaddeus Young (7)
| Jrue Holiday (10)
| Wells Fargo Center15,448
| 18-26
|- style="background:#cfc;"
| 45 || January 30 || Washington
| 
| Jrue Holiday (21)
| Spencer Hawes (11)
| Jrue Holiday (6)
| Wells Fargo Center15,101
| 19-26

|- style="background:#cfc;"
| 46 || February 1 || Sacramento
| 
| Thaddeus Young (23)
| Thaddeus Young (15)
| Jrue Holiday (7)
| Wells Fargo Center17,927
| 20-26
|- style="background:#cfc;"
| 47 || February 4 || Orlando
| 
| Spencer Hawes (21)
| Spencer Hawes (14)
| Jrue Holiday (14)
| Wells Fargo Center14,630
| 21-26
|- style="background:#fcc;"
| 48 || February 6 || Indiana
| 
| Jrue Holiday (19)
| Spencer Hawes (10)
| Holiday & Turner (4)
| Wells Fargo Center15,299
| 21-27
|- style="background:#cfc;"
| 49 || February 9 || Charlotte
| 
| Jrue Holiday (20)
| Lavoy Allen (22)
| Jrue Holiday (7)
| Wells Fargo Center15,048
| 22-27
|- style="background:#fcc;"
| 50 || February 11 || L. A. Clippers
| 
| Nick Young (29)
| Spencer Hawes (10)
| Jrue Holiday (9)
| Wells Fargo Center17,550
| 22-28
|- style="background:#fcc;"
| 51 || February 13 || @ Milwaukee
| 
| Evan Turner (20)
| Spencer Hawes (9)
| Jrue Holiday (12)
| Bradley Center15,114
| 22-29
|- align="center"
|colspan="9" bgcolor="#bbcaff"|All-Star Break
|- style="background:#fcc;"
| 52 || February 20 || @ Minnesota
| 
| Evan Turner (17)
| Spencer Hawes (8)
| Jrue Holiday (5)
| Target Center14,439
| 22-30
|- style="background:#fcc;"
| 53 || February 23 || Miami
| 
| Jrue Holiday (21)
| Evan Turner (7)
| Jrue Holiday (6)
| Wells Fargo Center20,665
| 22-31
|- style="background:#fcc;"
| 54 || February 24 || @ New York
| 
| Jrue Holiday (30)
| Nick Young (10)
| Evan Turner (8)
| Madison Square Garden19,033
| 22-32
|- style="background:#fcc;"
| 55 || February 26 || Orlando
| 
| Pargo & Wilkins (14)
| Thaddeus Young (10)
| Jrue Holiday (10)
| Wells Fargo Center18,432
| 22-33
|- style="background:#fcc;"
| 56 || February 28 || @ Chicago
| 
| Jrue Holiday (22)
| Spencer Hawes (15)
| Evan Turner (4)
| United Center21,576
| 22-34

|- style="background:#cfc;"
| 57 || March 2 || Golden State
| 
| Jrue Holiday (27)
| Thaddeus Young (16)
| Evan Turner (9)
| Wells Fargo Center17,929
| 23-34
|- style="background:#fcc;"
| 58 || March 3 || @ Washington
| 
| Dorell Wright (15)
| Spencer Hawes (11)
| Jrue Holiday (6)
| Verizon Center17,370
| 23-35
|- style="background:#fcc;"
| 59 || March 5 || Boston
| 
| Thaddeus Young (19)
| Thaddeus Young (10)
| Jrue Holiday (10)
| Wells Fargo Center16,189
| 23-36
|- style="background:#fcc;"
| 60 || March 6 || @ Atlanta
| 
| Damien Wilkins (21)
| Spencer Hawes (11)
| Jrue Holiday (12)
| Philips Arena13,018
| 23-37
|- style="background:#fcc;"
| 61 || March 8 || @ Miami
| 
| Thaddeus Young (25)
| Spencer Hawes (10)
| Jrue Holiday (13)
| American Airlines Arena20,029
| 23-38
|- style="background:#fcc;"
| 62 || March 10 || @ Orlando
| 
| Thaddeus Young (26)
| Thaddeus Young (12)
| Jrue Holiday (8)
| Amway Center16,317
| 23-39
|- style="background:#cfc;"
| 63 || March 11 || Brooklyn
| 
| Spencer Hawes (24)
| Thaddeus Young (10)
| Jrue Holiday (11)
| Wells Fargo Center16,789
| 24-39
|- style="background:#fcc;"
| 64 || March 13 || Miami
| 
| Thaddeus Young (24)
| Thaddeus Young (15)
| Jrue Holiday (7)
| Wells Fargo Center20,398
| 24-40
|- style="background:#cfc;"
| 65 || March 16 || Indiana
| 
| Jrue Holiday (27)
| Spencer Hawes (16)
| Jrue Holiday (12)
| Wells Fargo Center18,587
| 25-40
|- style="background:#cfc;"
| 66 || March 18 || Portland
| 
| Jrue Holiday (27)
| Spencer Hawes (13)
| Damien Wilkins (6)
| Wells Fargo Center15,623
| 26-40
|- style="background:#fcc;"
| 67 || March 20 || @ L. A. Clippers
| 
| Spencer Hawes (16)
| Thaddeus Young (8)
| Spencer Hawes (7)
| Staples Center19,187
| 26-41
|- style="background:#fcc;"
| 68 || March 21 || @ Denver
| 
| Damien Wilkins (24)
| Spencer Hawes (12)
| Jrue Holiday (15)
| Pepsi Center19,155
| 26-42
|- style="background:#cfc;"
| 69 || March 24 || @ Sacramento
| 
| Dorell Wright (22)
| Spencer Hawes, Jrue Holiday (10)
| Evan Turner (8)
| Power Balance Pavilion14,647
| 27-42
|- style="background:#fcc;"
| 70 || March 25 || @ Utah
| 
| Dorell Wright (19)
| Spencer Hawes, Lavoy Allen, Arnett Moultrie (8)
| Dorell Wright (4)
| EnergySolutions Arena17,336
| 27-43
|- style="background:#cfc;"
| 71 || March 27 || Milwaukee
| 
| Damien Wilkins, Jrue Holiday (18)
| Spencer Hawes (17)
| Jrue Holiday (6)
| Wells Fargo Center16,640
| 28-43
|- style="background:#cfc;"
| 72 || March 29 || @ Cleveland
| 
| Evan Turner (23)
| Evan Turner (13)
| Damien Wilkins & Jrue Holiday (6)
| Quicken Loans Arena17,324
| 29-43
|- style="background:#cfc;"
| 73 || March 30 || Charlotte
| 
| Evan Turner (22)
| Thaddeus Young (10)
| Jrue Holiday (9)
| Wells Fargo Center16,764
| 30-43

|- style="background:#fcc;"
| 74 || April 3 || @ Charlotte
| 
| Damien Wilkins (20)
| Damien Wilkins (9)
| Jrue Holiday (8)
| Time Warner Cable Arena13,097
| 30-44
|- style="background:#cfc;"
| 75 || April 5 || @ Atlanta
| 
| Evan Turner (24)
| Thaddeus Young (13)
| Jrue Holiday (8)
| Philips Arena17,020
| 31-44
|- style="background:#fcc;"
| 76 || April 6 || @ Miami
| 
| Jrue Holiday (18)
| Spencer Hawes (11)
| Jrue Holiday (6)
| American Airlines Arena20,168
| 31-45
|- style="background:#fcc;"
| 77 || April 9 || @ Brooklyn
| 
| Thaddeus Young (18)
| Spencer Hawes (6)
| Evan Turner (5)
| Barclays Center17,192
| 31-46
|- style="background:#fcc;"
| 78 || April 10 || Atlanta
| 
| Thaddeus Young (28)
| Thaddeus Young (8)
| Evan Turner (7)
| Wells Fargo Center17,178
| 31-47
|- style="background:#cfc;"
| 79 || April 12 || @ Washington
| 
| Jrue Holiday (22)
| Thaddeus Young (13)
| Evan Turner (7)
| Verizon Center18,476
| 32-47
|- style="background:#cfc;"
| 80 || April 14 || Cleveland
| 
| Dorell Wright (15)
| Thaddeus Young (9)
| Spencer Hawes (6)
| Wells Fargo Center18,764
| 33-47
|- style="background:#fcc;"
| 81 || April 15 || @ Detroit
| 
| Dorell Wright (22)
| Spencer Hawes (9)
| Dorell Wright (6)
| The Palace of Auburn Hills17,525
| 33-48
|- style="background:#cfc;"
| 82 || April 17 || @ Indiana
| 
| Dorell Wright (23)
| Arnett Moultrie (12)
| Evan Turner (5)
| Bankers Life Fieldhouse18,165
| 34-48

Notable Transactions

Additions

Subtractions

References

Philadelphia 76ers seasons
Philadelphia 76ers
Philadelphia
Philadelphia